is a former Japanese football player.

Playing career
Watanabe was born in Tokyo on May 20, 1973. He joined Verdy Kawasaki from youth team in 1992. Although he played as midfielder, he could not become a regular player behind Ruy Ramos, Tsuyoshi Kitazawa, Bismarck, Masakiyo Maezono and so on. In 1999, he moved to Brazilian club XV Novembro Jaú. In 2000, he returned to Japan and joined Shonan Bellmare. Although he became a regular player in 2000, his opportunity to play decreased in 2001 and retired end of 2001 season.

Club statistics

References

External links

1973 births
Living people
Association football people from Tokyo
Japanese footballers
Japanese men's futsal players
J1 League players
J2 League players
Tokyo Verdy players
Shonan Bellmare players
Association football midfielders